

Data of the World Bank Group (2020)

List of countries by life expectancy at birth for 2020 according to the World Bank Group. The data is filtered according to the list of countries in North America. The values in the World Bank Group tables are rounded. All calculations are based on raw data; so due to the nuances of rounding, in some places illusory inconsistencies of indicators arose, with a size of 0.01 year.

Data of the World Bank Group (2019)

List of countries by life expectancy at birth for 2019 according to the World Bank Group.

Data of WHO (2019)
List of countries by life expectancy for 2019 according to the World Health Organization.

See also

References

Life expectancy
North America